The Erzsébetliget Theatre is a theatre in Mátyásföld, Budapest.

History 
The English-Hungarian indie rock band, Dawnstar, played three shows at the theatre in 2006. The third concert was part of Feró Nagy's Rock Klub.

In 2015, the Hungarian rock band Quimby played a show at the theatre.

In 2017 the 28th Junior National Dance festival was held at the theatre by the Táncpedagógusok Országos Szövetsége.

In 2017, the second Vingardium Borliget festival was held at the premises of the theatre.

Gallery

References

External links 
Official home page of the Erzsébetliget Theatre

Buildings and structures in Budapest
Culture in Budapest
Theatres in Budapest
Tourist attractions in Budapest